A right inverse in mathematics may refer to:

 A right inverse element with respect to a binary operation on a set
 A right inverse function for a mapping between sets

See also 
 Right-cancellative
 Loop (algebra), an algebraic structure with identity element where every element has a unique left and right inverse
 Section (category theory), a right inverse of some morphism
 Left inverse (disambiguation)